Pittsburgh is a 2006 mockumentary comedy film that follows American actor Jeff Goldblum as he attempts to secure a green card for his Canadian actor/singer/dancer girlfriend Catherine Wreford by appearing with her as the leads in a summer regional theatre production of The Music Man in Goldblum's hometown of Pittsburgh, Pennsylvania.

The film features numerous other famous personalities portraying themselves, including Ed Begley Jr. (who had worked with Goldblum on Transylvania 6-5000), Illeana Douglas (who directed Goldblum in her own film Supermarket), Moby (as Douglas's boyfriend), Conan O'Brien and Craig Kilborn (hosting Goldblum on their respective shows), Alanis Morissette, and Tom Cavanagh.

Though some of the primary events of the story took place (for example, Goldblum did perform The Music Man with the Pittsburgh Civic Light Opera at the Benedum Center, though that performance was staged solely for the film) "Pittsburgh" was, with a few improvisational flourishes, totally scripted. Many of the deleted scenes included on the DVD release of the film are far more overtly comic than those the filmmakers chose to include in the finished product and make the fictional nature of the project more obvious.

Cast
 Jeff Goldblum as himself
 Conan O'Brien as himself
 Catherine Wreford as herself
 Ed Begley Jr. as himself
 Illeana Douglas as herself
 Moby as himself
 Craig Kilborn as himself
 Alanis Morissette as herself
 Tom Cavanagh as himself
 Jon Clunies as himself playing Ewart Dunlop in the Music Man
 Flanzinee as himself

References

External links

2006 films
2000s mockumentary films
American mockumentary films
Films set in Pittsburgh
2006 comedy films
2000s English-language films
2000s American films